Kadua cordata (formerly Hedyotis schlechtendahliana) is a species of flowering plant in the coffee family known by the common name kopa. It is endemic to Hawaii.

There are at least two varieties of the species. One, variety remyi, is a federally listed endangered species in the United States. It is known only from the island of Lanai. , one individual, a seedling, is known to exist in the wild. The U.S. Fish and Wildlife Service had reported, in its previous review in 2014, the existence of two individuals. Some plants are kept at the National Tropical Botanic Garden on Kauai.

References

External links
USDA Plants Profile

cordata
Endemic flora of Hawaii
Biota of Lanai
Taxa named by Adelbert von Chamisso
Flora without expected TNC conservation status